Krzysztof Jakub Putra  (July 4, 1957 – April 10, 2010) was a Polish  politician, a member of the Law and Justice (PiS). He served as a Deputy of the Senate Marshal from October 27, 2005 until November 4, 2007. He later became a Sejm member (from November 5) and PiS candidate for Sejm Marshal.

Biography

Putra was born in Józefowo, Suwałki County. He was a grandson of Aleksander Putra, who served as Sejm Member before World War II from Polish People's Party.

A member of Solidarity during Communist rule, he was a worker in Białystok from 1975 to 1994. He was also a Sejm Member  (Contract Sejm) from Solidarity (1989–1991). Later he was elected from Centre Agreement and was one of the founder of Law and Justice in 2001. He is known as one of the Party leader, in addition to serve as party leader in his home Podlaskie Voivodeship.

As one of the Deputies of the Senate Marshal he was regarded as a de facto leader of the upper house.

He was picked by the Law and Justice and their candidate for Sejm Marshal. However, he lost soundly to Civic Platform's majority nominee Bronisław Komorowski. His candidature was viewed as a political demonstration; however, he was elected one of the Vice-Marshals a day later.

He was married and had eight children.

He was listed on the flight manifest of the Tupolev Tu-154 of the 36th Special Aviation Regiment carrying the President of Poland Lech Kaczyński which crashed near Smolensk North Airport near Pechersk near Smolensk, Russia, on 10 April 2010, killing all aboard.

On 16 April 2010, Putra was posthumously awarded the Commander's Cross with Star of the Order of Polonia Restituta and on April 20, 2010 he was buried at St. Roch's Church in Białystok.

References

1957 births
2010 deaths
People from Suwałki County
Members of the Polish Sejm 1991–1993
Members of the Senate of Poland 2005–2007
Commanders with Star of the Order of Polonia Restituta
Victims of the Smolensk air disaster
Polish Roman Catholics
Deputy Marshals of the Sejm of the Third Polish Republic
Members of the Polish Sejm 2007–2011